Franz Walther Kuhn (10 March 1884 – 22 January 1961) was a German lawyer and translator chiefly remembered for translating many Chinese novels into German, most famously the Dream of the Red Chamber.

Biography 
Kuhn studied law at the University of Leipzig and the University of Berlin, passing his state examination in 1908 and obtaining his doctorate in 1909. He began to practice law in Dresden in 1909. He was soon assigned to the German delegation to Peking as an interpreter, having completed a course of Chinese during his study at Berlin. He stayed in China until 1912.

After the First World War, Kuhn began to translate classic Chinese literature into German. Eventually he ran into conflict with the Nazi authorities, who considered his works to be harmful. After the end of World War II, Kuhn's work began to be more widely known and appreciated. He received the Order of Merit of the Federal Republic of Germany in 1952.

Jorge Luis Borges attributes the discovery of a "paradoxical list of animals" to Kuhn. The list has become the subject of much modern commentary after it was cited by Foucault. However, Borges's attribution is the only known evidence that either such a work existed or that Kuhn discussed it (it is, actually, a fictional attribution; see Otras Inquisiciones (in Spanish)).

Translations 
 Chinesische Staatsweisheit, Darmstadt 1923
 Chinesische Meisternovellen, Leipzig 1926
 Eisherz und Edeljaspis oder Die Geschichte einer glücklichen Gattenwahl, Leipzig 1926
 Die Rache des jungen Meh oder Das Wunder der zweiten Pflaumenblüte, Leipzig 1927
 Das Perlenhemd, Leipzig 1928
 Kin Ping Meh oder Die abenteuerliche Geschichte von Hsi Men und seinen sechs Frauen, Leipzig 1930
 Fräulein Tschang, Berlin [u.a.] 1931
 Der Traum der roten Kammer, Leipzig 1932
 Die Räuber vom Liang-Schan-Moor, Leipzig 1934
 Die Jadelibelle, Berlin 1936
 Das Juwelenkästchen, Dresden 1937
 Mao Dun: Schanghai im Zwielicht, Dresden 1938
 Die dreizehnstöckige Pagode, Berlin 1939
 Mondfrau und Silbervase, Berlin 1939
 Die drei Reiche, Berlin 1940
 Das Rosenaquarell, Zürich 1947
 Das Tor der östlichen Blüte, Düsseldorf 1949
 Und Buddha lacht, Baden-Baden 1950
 Der Turm der fegenden Wolken, Freiburg i. Br. 1951
 Kin Ku Ki Kwan, Zürich 1952
 Goldamsel flötet am Westsee, Freiburg i. Br. 1953
 Wen Kang: Die schwarze Reiterin, Zürich 1954
 Blumenschatten hinter dem Vorhang, Freiburg i. Br. 1956
 Altchinesische Liebesgeschichten, Wiesbaden 1958
 Die schöne Li. Vom Totenhemd ins Brautkleid, Wiesbaden 1959
 Li Yü: Jou pu tuan, Zürich 1959
 Goldjunker Sung und andere Novellen aus dem Kin Ku Ki Kwan, Zürich 1960

See also 
 List of translators

Notes

References 
 Kuhn, Hatto. Dr. Franz Kuhn (1884–1961): Lebensbeschreibung und Bibliographie seiner Werke: mit einem Anhang unveroffentlichter Schriften. Wiesbaden: Steiner, Sinologica Coloniensia; 1980. 180 pp. Bd. 10 . 
 Walravens, Hartmut. Franz Kuhn. Hamburg 1982.
 Peng Chang. Modernisierung und Europäisierung der klassischen chinesischen Prosadichtung. Frankfurt am Main [u.a.] 1991.

External links 
 
 , a short story/essay where Borges attributes a paradoxical list of animals to Kuhn's work on a Chinese encyclopedia.

Kuhn, Franz Walter
Kuhn, Franz Walter
20th-century translators
Chinese–German translators
German expatriates in China
German male non-fiction writers
Officers Crosses of the Order of Merit of the Federal Republic of Germany
Leipzig University alumni